The southern red bat (Lasiurus blossevillii) is a species of microbat found in South America.

Taxonomy 
Previously, the western red bat (L. frantzii) was classified as a subspecies of the southern red bat, but phylogenetic evidence supports it being a distinct species. This has been followed by the American Society of Mammalogists and the ITIS.

It was named after French explorer Jules de Blosseville.

Distribution 

The species is recorded in Argentina, Bolivia, Brazil, Colombia, Ecuador (Galápagos Islands), French Guiana, Guyana, Paraguay, Peru, Suriname, Trinidad and Tobago, Uruguay and Venezuela.

See also
Eastern red bat — Lasiurus borealis
Western red bat – previously considered a subspecies of Lasiurus blossevillii
Bats of the United States

References

Arizona Game and Fish species account-Western Red Bat

External links
Bat Conservation International: Information about the western red bat (desert red bat)
Western bat Working Group website: Accurate information on western red bats
Nsrl.ttu.ed: western red bat
Earthlink.net: Picture of a red bat + information

Lasiurus
Bats of North America
Bats of Central America
Bats of South America
Bats of Brazil
Bats of Mexico
Bats of the United States
Bats of the Caribbean
Mammals of Argentina
Mammals of Canada
Mammals of Colombia
Mammals of Ecuador
Mammals of French Guiana
Mammals of Guyana
Mammals of Paraguay
Mammals of Peru
Mammals of Suriname
Mammals of Trinidad and Tobago
Mammals of Uruguay
Mammals of Venezuela
Fauna of the Amazon
Fauna of the Western United States
Fauna of California
Fauna of the Rocky Mountains
Fauna of the Sierra Nevada (United States)
Mammals described in 1826